Otho Lovering (December 1, 1892 – October 25, 1968) was an American filmmaker with about eighty editing credits on feature films and television programs.

Biography
Born in 1892, he was the son of Frank Lovering, a stenographer, and Georgie Lovering. He worked for Vitagraph Studios as a film printing foreman, according to his 1917 World War I draft registration card.

A highlight of Lovering's career was his editing of director John Ford's classic Western film Stagecoach (1939). Lovering's co-editor was Dorothy Spencer, with whom Lovering had already edited several films starting in 1937. The pair were nominated for the Academy Award for Best Film Editing for the film. Over 20 years later, Ford picked Lovering as his editor again following the 1961 death of Jack Murray, who had edited most of Ford's films in the 1940s and 1950s. Lovering edited four films, from The Man Who Shot Liberty Valance (1962) through Ford's last feature film, 7 Women (1966).

Filmography
This filmography is based on the listing at the Internet Movie Database; credits are for editing unless indicated.

 The Good Guys and the Bad Guys (1969-uncredited)
 Young Billy Young (1969)
 The Green Berets (1968)
 The Way West (1967)
 The Ballad of Josie (1967)
 The Last of the Secret Agents? (1966)
 7 Women (1966)
 Ride Beyond Vengeance (1966)
 Shenandoah (1965)
 Cheyenne Autumn (1964)
 Law of the Lawless (1964)
 McLintock! (1963)
 Donovan's Reef (1963)
 Bonanza (2 episodes, 1962)
 The Man Who Shot Liberty Valance (1962)
 The Rebel (21 episodes, 1959-1961)
 Jack the Ripper (TV movie, 1958, uncredited)
 The Veil (1958)
 Destination Nightmare (1958)
 The Veil (7 episodes, 1958)
 Lassie (1 episode, 1954)
 The Abbott and Costello Show (6 episodes, 1953)
 Jack and the Beanstalk (1952)
 Disc Jockey (1951)
 The Lion Hunters (1951)
 Navy Bound (1951)
 Short Grass (1950)
 A Modern Marriage (1950)
 The Lost Volcano (1950)
 Joe Palooka in Humphrey Takes a Chance (1950)
 Young Daniel Boone (1950)
 Joe Palooka Meets Humphrey (1950)
 Blue Grass of Kentucky (1950)
 Bomba on Panther Island (1949)
 Joe Palooka in the Counterpunch (1949)
 Mississippi Rhythm (1949)
 Bomba, the Jungle Boy (1949)
 Joe Palooka in the Big Fight (1949)
 Bad Boy (1949)
 Joe Palooka in Winner Take All (1948)
 The Shanghai Chest (1948)
 Docks of New Orleans (1948)
 Joe Palooka in the Knockout (1947)
 Suspense (1946)
 Pardon My Past (1945)
 Jacaré (1942)
 Slightly Honorable (with Dorothy Spencer, 1940)
 Foreign Correspondent (supervising editor, with Dorothy Spencer, 1940)
 Eternally Yours (with Dorothy Spencer, 1939)
 Winter Carnival (with Dorothy Spencer, 1939)
 Stagecoach (with Dorothy Spencer, 1939)
 Blockade (supervising editor, with William H. Reynolds and Dorothy Spencer, 1938)
 Trade Winds (with Dorothy Spencer, 1938)
 Algiers (with William H. Reynolds, 1938)
 I Met My Love Again (with Edward Mann, 1938)
 Stand-In (with Dorothy Spencer, 1937)
 Vogues of 1938 (with Dorothy Spencer, 1937)
 I Met Him in Paris (1937)
 Valiant Is the Word for Carrie (1936)
 The Sky Parade (1936)
 Accent on Youth (1935)
 Shanghai (1935)
 Stolen Harmony (1935)
 The Gilded Lily (1935)
 We Live Again (1934)
 You're Telling Me! (1934)
 All of Me (1934)
 I'm No Angel (1933)
 A Bedtime Story (1933)
 A Farewell to Arms (with George Nichols, Jr., 1932)
 Devil and the Deep (1932)
 The Conquering Horde (1931)
 The Virtuous Sin (1930)
 Manslaughter (1930)
 Anybody's War (1930)
 The Social Lion (1930)
 Street of Chance (1930)
 The Mighty (1929)
 The Wheel of Life (1929)
 The Wild Party (1929)
 Redskin (1929)
 Moran of the Marines (1928)
 Take Me Home (1928)
 The Sawdust Paradise (1928)
 Warming Up (1928)
 Easy Come, Easy Go (1928)
 Sporting Goods (1928)

See also
List of film director and editor collaborations

References

Sources 

Otho Lovering > Overview - at Allmovie

1892 births
1968 deaths
American film editors
Artists from Philadelphia